Ben, Bennie or Benjamin Ward may refer to:

 Ben Ward (darts player) (born 1988), English darts player
 Ben Ward (rugby union) (born 1984), English rugby union player-coach
 Bennie Ward (born 1948), American theoretical particle physicist
 Benjamin Ward (1926–2002), first black New York City Police Commissioner
 Benjamin Ward (cricketer) (born 1998), Jersey cricketer
 Benjamin F. Ward (1948–2013), professor of philosophy
 Ben Ward, British singer with Orange Goblin

See also
 Benjamin Ward Richardson (1828–1896), British physician
 Ward (surname)
 Ward (given name)